Giave is a comune (municipality) in the Province of Sassari in the Italian region Sardinia, located about  north of Cagliari and about  southeast of Sassari.

Giave borders the following municipalities: Bonorva, Cheremule, Cossoine, Thiesi, Torralba.

Demographic history

References 

Cities and towns in Sardinia